The  or Yoyogi Gyoen is a public garden adjacent to Meiji Shrine and Yoyogi Park in Shibuya, Tokyo. The garden was once part of the suburban residences of Katō Kiyomasa and later the Ii clan during the Edo period. During the Meiji period, the garden came under the supervision of the Imperial Household Agency and named Yoyogi Gyoen (Yoyogi Imperial Garden) and was frequently visited by Emperor Meiji and Empress Shōken. The garden contains a tea house, an arbour, a fishing stand and an iris garden. It has an area of 83,000 square meters and is open to the public throughout the year.

Notes

References

External links
gyoen at Meiji Jingu Shrine official web site

Gardens in Tokyo
Shibuya